Stephen Hankins (birth registered second ¼ 1952) is a former professional rugby league footballer who played as a  or . He played at club level for Dewsbury, Featherstone Rovers and Bramley, and also represented Yorkshire.

Playing career

Featherstone Rovers
Hankins made his début for Featherstone Rovers on 3 February 1980. During his time at the club he made 137 appearances, scoring 13 tries.

Yorkshire
Hankins played in both games for Yorkshire in the 1979–80 County Championship.

References

1952 births
Living people
English rugby league players
Rugby league players from Pontefract
Rugby league props
Rugby league second-rows
Dewsbury Rams players
Featherstone Rovers players
Bramley RLFC players
Yorkshire rugby league team players